The 2013–14 Slovak First Football League (known as the Slovak Corgoň Liga for sponsorship reasons) was the 21st season of first-tier football league in Slovakia, since its establishment in 1993. This season started on 12 July 2013 and ended on 31 May 2014.

ŠK Slovan Bratislava were the defending champions and successfully retained their league title.

Teams
A total of 12 teams competed in the league, including 11 sides from the 2012–13 season and one promoted from the 2. liga.

Relegation for 1. FC Tatran Prešov to the 2013–14 Slovak Second Football League was confirmed on 26 May 2013. The one relegated team was replaced by FK DAC 1904 Dunajská Streda.

Stadiums and locations

Personnel and kits

Managerial changes

Notes
 Adrián Guľa was announced new MŠK Žilina manager for the 2013–14 season on 3 January 2013.

League table

Results

First and second round

Third round

Season statistics

Top scorers
Updated through matches played on 31 May 2014

Hat-tricks

Awards

Top Eleven

Goalkeeper:  Darko Tofiloski (MFK Košice)
Defence:  Mamadou Bagayoko (ŠK Slovan),  Peter Kleščík (AS Trenčín),  Nicolas Ezequiel Gorosito (Šk Slovan),  Boris Sekulić (MFK Košice)
Midfield:  Gino van Kessel (AS Trenčín),  Viktor Pečovský (MŠK Žilina),  Igor Žofčák (ŠK Slovan),  Marko Milinković (ŠK Slovan)
Attack:  Róbert Vittek (ŠK Slovan),  Juraj Piroska (FK Senica)

Individual Awards

Manager of the season
Jozef Valovič (ŠK Slovan) and Radoslav Látal (MFK Košice)

Player of the Year
Róbert Vittek (ŠK Slovan)

Young player of the Year
Martin Chrien (Dukla Banská Bystrica)

See also
2013–14 Slovak Cup
2013–14 2. Liga (Slovakia)

Stats 
 List of foreign players
 List of transfers summer 2013
 List of transfers winter 2013-14

References

Slova
2013-14
1